Realms of the Haunting is a first-person adventure shooter game developed by Gremlin Interactive and published by Interplay Productions. It was released in 1997 for MS-DOS compatible operating systems. The 3D engine used in this game was borrowed from Gremlin's own Normality.

Plot
Adam Randall ventures to a haunted house in order to investigate the mysterious circumstances around his father's death. As he enters, however, the doors lock behind him and he is forced to journey throughout the entire house while looking for answers as well as means of escaping it. Along the way he meets up with a psychic woman, Rebecca Trevisard, who provides Adam with guidance as they work together to escape. Adam soon discovers the house contains portals to several different universes, and that he is the Chosen One who must prevent the final apocalyptic battle between the forces of good and evil.

The game has over 40 hours of content, includes many different universes to travel, and has a plot which involves multiple sides fighting for their own causes. The beginning gives the idea of Adam being against demonic forces, but later the player finds him caught in a much deeper plot between different forces, where demons play only one role.

Gameplay
The player explores locations and battles demons from a first-person perspective. A floating cursor is used to interact with the environment and pick up items. The game features many inventory-based puzzles.

The story of Realms of the Haunting is told through full-motion video cutscenes, which utilize live-action actors.

Development
Realms of the Haunting was Gremlin's most expensive project yet. The lead programmer on the game was Antony Crowther.

GOG.com released an emulated version for Microsoft Windows, Linux and Mac OS X in 2011.

Reception

Realms of the Haunting was met with critical acclaim. It received an average score of 92% at GameRankings, based on an aggregate of 7 reviews. Though he noted a lack of originality in the basic plot, Air Hendrix of GamePro found the high-quality cinematics, atmospheric presentation, and overall strong gameplay as both a puzzle adventure and a first-person shooter made Realms of the Haunting a captivating experience. He summarized, "While sometimes it gets frustratingly arbitrary, overall the adventure side, action side, and story line blend together quite nicely." Both Air Hendrix and a Next Generation critic remarked that the controls are clunky at first but can be adjusted to with time. Next Generation was most impressed with the game's massive size, reckoning that it takes 80 to 100 hours to complete, rarely reuses textures or architectural designs in different areas, and has a huge variety of monsters. The reviewer concluded, "For something that came from Interplay with very little fanfare, Realms of the Haunting could be one of the best adventure games of this year."

Realms of the Haunting was a finalist for the Academy of Interactive Arts & Sciences' 1997 "Computer Adventure Game of the Year" award, which ultimately went to Blade Runner.

Further reading
Issue 108 of Retro Gamer has a short making of Realms of the Haunting as part of a Tales from the Retro Crypt feature. Written by Graeme Mason, it contains extracts of an interview with Gremlin producer Paul Green.

References

External links

1997 video games
DOS games
First-person adventure games
First-person shooters
Full motion video based games
Games commercially released with DOSBox
Gremlin Interactive games
Horror video games
Interplay Entertainment games
Linux games
MacOS games
Point-and-click adventure games
Single-player video games
Video games about demons
Windows games
Video games with 2.5D graphics
Sprite-based first-person shooters
Video games developed in the United Kingdom